Stroud Green railway station is a former station in the Stroud Green area of north London. It was located between Finsbury Park station and Crouch End station on a bridge over Stapleton Hall Road. The station had platforms (now demolished) cantilevered from the bridge structure and a wooden station building (also now demolished) at ground level under and on either side of the bridge, with a station master's house to the north of it. The bridge still exists and now carries the Parkland Walk cycle and pedestrian path, whilst the station master's house serves as a community centre.

The Gospel Oak to Barking line of Network Rail passes under both Stapleton Hall Road and the Stroud Green station site in a tunnel, between Crouch Hill and Harringay Green Lanes stations; it can be seen from the former platforms of Stroud Green station. The station site is within the area of the London Borough of Haringey, close to that borough's boundary with that of Islington.

History

The station was built by the Great Northern Railway (GNR) and opened on the railway's existing Edgware, Highgate and London Line on 11 April 1881.  The line ran from Finsbury Park to Edgware via Highgate, with branches to Alexandra Palace and High Barnet.  After the 1921 Railways Act created the Big Four railway companies, the line became part of the London & North Eastern Railway (LNER) in 1923.

In 1935, London Underground planned, as part of its New Works Programme to take over the line from LNER, modernise it for use with electric trains and amalgamate it with the Northern line.

Works to modernise the track began in the late 1930s and were well advanced when they were interrupted and halted by the Second World War.  Works were completed from Highgate to High Barnet and Mill Hill East and that section was incorporated into the Northern line between 1939 and 1941.  Further works on the section between Finsbury Park, Highgate and Alexandra Palace were postponed and the line continued under the operation of the LNER. After the war, the dwindling passenger numbers and a shortage of funds lead to the cancellation of the unfinished works in 1950. British Railways, the successor to the LNER, closed the line temporarily from 29 October 1951 until 7 January 1952. Passenger services to Stroud Green station were ended by British Railways after the last train on 3 July 1954, along with the rest of the line between Finsbury Park and Alexandra Palace.

The line continued to be used for goods into the 1960s and by London Underground for train stock movements until 6 October 1970, when it was completely closed. The station buildings were gutted by a fire on 3 February 1967 and were demolished shortly thereafter. The track was lifted in 1972 and most of the track bed between Muswell Hill and Finsbury Park reused as the Parkland Walk, which opened in 1984. The station master's house, located next to the now demolished station building, was converted for community use.

References

External links

Disused Stations: Stroud Green
London Transport Museum Photographic Archive

Disused railway stations in the London Borough of Haringey
Former Great Northern Railway stations
Proposed London Underground stations
Unopened Northern Heights extension stations
Railway stations in Great Britain opened in 1881
Railway stations in Great Britain closed in 1954
1881 establishments in England